GLA or Gla may refer to:

Entertainment 
 GLA (album), by Scottish alternative rock band Twin Atlantic
 Great Lakes Avengers, a fictional comic hero group

Science and technology 
 Alpha-galactosidase, a glycoside hydrolase enzyme
 GLA (gene), an encoding of the enzyme alpha-galactosidase A
 Gla domain, a protein domain
 Gamma-Linolenic acid, a fatty acid
 Linde–Buzo–Gray algorithm (also called Generalized Lloyd Algorithm), a vector quantization algorithm

Other uses 
 Gla, a Mycenaean fortification in Greece
 Gross leasable area, used in Real Estate as the total floorspace in a project available for lease or rent
 GLA University, in Mathura Uttar Pradesh, India
 Gangmasters Licensing Authority, a British regulatory body
 General lighthouse authority
 Georgia Library Association
 Ghana Library Association
 Glamorgan, historic county in Wales, Chapman code
 Glassbridge Enterprises, where GLA was its former NYSE ticker symbol
 Glasgow Airport, IATA call-sign 
 Global Leadership Adventures, an international high school study abroad program
 Great Lakes Airlines, an American airline
 Greater London Authority
 Guam Library Association
 Mercedes-Benz GLA-Class
 Scottish Gaelic, ISO 639-2 & ISO 639-3 language codes